Conasprella sieboldii, common name Siebold's cone, is a species of sea snail, a marine gastropod mollusk in the family Conidae, the cone snails and their allies.

Like all species within the genus Conasprella, these cone snails are predatory and venomous. They are capable of "stinging" humans, therefore live ones should be handled carefully or not at all.

Description
The size of the shell varies between 51 mm and 129 mm.

Distribution
This marine species occurs off Japan and Taiwan.

References

External links
 The Conus Biodiversity website
 Cone Shells – Knights of the Sea
 

sieboldii
Gastropods described in 1848